Jean Auguste Barre (25 September 1811 – 5 February 1896) was a French sculptor and medalist. Born in Paris, he was trained by his father Jean-Jacques Barre (1793–1855), a medalist. Barre studied at the École nationale supérieure des Beaux-Arts in Paris under Jean-Pierre Cortot, and he is mainly known as a portrait sculptor.

Exhibiting at the French Salon from 1831 to 1886, his first showings were of medallions and medals. Barre is known to be one of the first sculptors to make miniatures of famous contemporaries, such as Napoleon III, Queen Victoria, dancers Marie Taglioni and Emma Livry, and Susan B. Anthony. His bronze works are on display in such places as the Louvre and the Cleveland Art Museum.

One of his stone works is found in the cemetery of Père Lachaise Cemetery, where he did a bust for the tomb of his friend Alfred de Musset.

He died in Paris in 1896.

Bibliography
 Davenport's 2001-02 Art Reference & Price Guide
 1999 Benezit, Vol. 1
 Berman's Bronzes, Vol. 2
 Web site of the Louvre

External links

 www.insecula.com

References 

1811 births
1896 deaths
French medallists
Artists from Paris
19th-century French sculptors
French male sculptors

19th-century French male artists